Rachel Mandelbaum is a professor of astrophysics at Carnegie Mellon University, studying cosmology and galactic evolution with a focus on dark matter and dark energy. Much of her work has used the phenomenon of gravitational lensing of galaxies and she has made significant improvements in the calibration of lensing parameters.

Education 
Mandelbaum received her A.B. in physics with highest honors from Princeton University in 2000.

She received her Ph.D. in physics from Princeton University in 2006 and is a tenured Associate Professor of Physics at the Carnegie Mellon University.

Research 

Mandelbaum studies cosmology using the technique of weak gravitational lensing. She has contributed to more than 100 published papers since 2011. She is currently the spokesperson for the LSST Dark Energy Science Collaboration, elected in 2019 and serving until July 1, 2021.

Personal life 
Mandelbaum is an Orthodox Jew. She is open about her faith.

Awards 
Mandelbaum has received numerous awards including the Alfred P. Sloan Fellowship in 2013, the Department of Energy Early Career Award in 2012 and the Annie Jump Cannon Award in Astronomy from the American Astronomical Society in 2011. In 2019, she was named a Simons Investigator by the Simons Foundation.

References

External links 
 Curriculum vitae and publications

Year of birth missing (living people)
Living people
American astrophysicists
American women physicists
Princeton University alumni
Carnegie Mellon University faculty
21st-century American physicists
21st-century American women scientists
Recipients of the Annie J. Cannon Award in Astronomy